Vladimir Kuvalja (born 20 June 1977) is a Yugoslavian road racing cyclist. He won his country's National Championship five times from 1993 to 2012, with pauses of a few years in between victories. He was in a National Team of Yugoslavia, Republic of Srpska and the Republic of Bosnia and Herzegovina. Kuvalja family is in cycling since 1963, his father Tihomir Kuvalja and uncle Tanasija Kuvalja are one of the founders and promotors of cycling in Yugoslavia.  

Being the organizer of the UCI GranFondo World Cycling Championship, held from 6 to 10 October this year. in East Sarajevo, after the victory of the Russian athlete Marina Letyaeva, V. Kuvalya ordered to perform the anthem of the Russian Federation, despite the sanctions imposed by WADA against Russian sports. 
By order of the Federal Agency "Rossotrudnichestvo" dated November 20, 2021, Vladimir Kuvalya, Vice President of the Balkan Cycling Union, was awarded the Badge of Honor "For Friendship and Cooperation". 

Kuvalja`s is 1.88 m (6 ft 1 in) tall and weighs 94 kg (179 lbs). He was the youngest rider ever to start Tour de Serbia and (Finish) Tour de Vojvodina at the age of 16.

Management career
Since 2008 General Director of the UCI Cycling Race Belgrade Banjaluka UCI 2.1 Cycling race
Since 2008 Member of the National Olympic Committee BiH,
Since 2010 Generation For Peace Pioneer,
Since 2011 Sport Director of the National Federation,
Since 2013 Director of The Grand Prix Sarajevo UCI 1.2 Cycling Race
Since 2015 director of the Association For Sport
Since 2015 Director of The Tour of Bulgaria UCI 2.2 Cycling Race
Since 2015 Director of the Black Sea Cycling Tour UCI 2.2 Cycling Race
Since 2016 Vice President of the Balkan Cycling Union
Since 2018 Director of the Tour de Serbia UCI 2.2 Cycling Race
Elected for the president of the Balkan Cycling Union

Major results
1993 National Champion
1994 National Champion
1995 World Junior Cup Tour de Greece Youth 15th
1996 National Champion
2003 EYOF France Paris
2005 Mediterranean Games Espana Almeria
2005 EYOF Italia
2009 Mediterranean Games Italia
2012 National Champion Bosnia and Herzegovina

Family

Vladimir Kuvalja has two daughters Korina and Nika.

References

1977 births
Living people
Bosnia and Herzegovina male cyclists
Serbs of Bosnia and Herzegovina